François Lavoie (born February 27, 1993) is a right-handed Canadian ten-pin bowler from Quebec City, Quebec, Canada, now making his home in Wichita, Kansas. He is a member of the Professional Bowlers Association, and has been a member of Team Canada. Lavoie has won five PBA Tour titles, including three major championships. He is one of only three players in history to roll a perfect 300 game in two televised PBA Tour title events, and the only player to bowl a 300 game in a U.S. Open telecast.

Lavoie is a member of the Storm and Turbo Grips pro staffs.

Amateur career
Lavoie won the 2013 World Bowling Championships trios gold medal (partners: Mark Buffa and Patrick Girard).

In 2014, Lavoie won the Intercollegiate Singles Championship as a member of the Wichita State University bowling team.

In 2015, Lavoie won the Intercollegiate Team Championship with Wichita State University, and the Pan Am Games doubles gold medal (with partner Dan MacLelland) in Toronto. During the men's doubles event Lavoie scored a perfect game in the fifth round, the first in Pan American Games history.

Lavoie was a four-time member of Youth Team Canada, and has been a four-time member of adult Team Canada. With Team Canada, he has won eight international medals (4 gold, 1 silver, 3 bronze).

In 2019, Lavoie was named to Canada's 2019 Pan American Games team.

Professional bowling career
Lavoie joined the Professional Bowlers Association (PBA) in 2015. In his first full PBA Tour season (2016), Lavoie won two titles, including his first major championship at the U.S. Open. He was named the 2016 Harry Golden Rookie of the Year. In 2017, Lavoie won his third PBA Tour title at the Xtra Frame Greater Jonesboro Open. He then went without a title for all of 2018.

On October 30, 2019, Lavoie won his fourth title and second major, again in the U.S. Open.

On February 28, 2021, Lavoie won his fifth PBA Tour title and third major at the Kia PBA Tournament of Champions. Lavoie climbed from the No. 5 seed in the stepladder final, beating a PBA major champion in all four of his matches to take the title and $100,000 top prize. On April 18, 2021, Lavoie won the Guaranteed Rate PBA Super Slam, a special non-title event featuring the five winners of the 2021 major championships. He defeated PBA Players Championship winner Kyle Troup in the final match to earn his second $100,000 first place check of the season. Lavoie qualified as the #4 seed at the 2021 PBA Tour Playoffs and made it to the semifinal round before being eliminated by top seed Kyle Troup.

Through the 2021 season, Lavoie's PBA earnings total over US$720,000, with $370,300 of that coming in the 2021 season alone.

He has rolled seven 300 games in PBA competition. Among these perfect games, Lavoie recorded the PBA's 26th televised 300 game in the semifinal match of the 2016 U.S. Open against Shawn Maldonado, who scored 211. This was just the sixth televised perfect game in a major tournament, and the first ever in the U.S. Open finals. Lavoie also recorded the PBA’s 29th televised 300 game in the Round of 16 at the 2020 PBA Tour Playoffs, becoming the second bowler in PBA history to roll two televised 300 games in an official PBA Tour event (the other being Sean Rash, whom Lavoie coincidentally defeated in that match). Chris Via has since become the third member of this exclusive club, rolling his second televised 300 game on June 27, 2021.

PBA Tour wins
Major titles in bold type.

 2016 U.S. Open (Las Vegas, Nevada). (Followed Mika Koivuniemi as the second international player to win the U.S. Open.)
 2016 Shark Championship (Reno, Nevada)
 2017 Xtra Frame Greater Jonesboro Open (Jonesboro, Arkansas)
 2019 U.S. Open (Mooresville, North Carolina)
2021 PBA Tournament of Champions (Jupiter, Florida)
Lavoie also owns eight PBA Regional titles, and he won the (non-title) PBA Regional Challenge at the 2017 PBA World Series of Bowling in Reno, NV. He was the 2016 Southwest Region Rookie of the Year and 2018 Southwest Region Player of the Year.

Career statistics

+CRA = Championship Round Appearances (PBA Tour only)

Personal
Lavoie graduated from Wichita State University with a degree in business administration. He claims to have started bowling at age 2, and he also enjoys ice hockey and tennis.

In August of 2022, Lavoie was elected Chairman of the International Bowling Federation (IBF) Athletes Committee.

References

External links
 Lavoie's Profile at PBA.com
 Lavoie's "Bowler" page on Facebook

1993 births
Canadian ten-pin bowling players
French Quebecers
Living people
Sportspeople from Quebec City
Bowlers at the 2015 Pan American Games
World Games gold medalists
World Games medalists in bowling
Competitors at the 2017 World Games
Pan American Games medalists in bowling
Pan American Games gold medalists for Canada
Bowlers at the 2019 Pan American Games
Medalists at the 2015 Pan American Games